Milan "Mile" Čop (born 5 October 1938, in Kingdom of Yugoslavia) is a Croatian retired football player.

International career
He made his debut for Yugoslavia in an October 1963 friendly match away against Romania and earned a total of 10 caps scoring no goals. His final international was an October 1964 Olympic Games match against Japan.

References

External links
 
Profile on Serbian federation official site
NASL stats

1938 births
Living people
Sportspeople from Slavonski Brod
Association football defenders
Yugoslav footballers
Yugoslavia international footballers
Olympic footballers of Yugoslavia
Footballers at the 1964 Summer Olympics
NK Marsonia players
Red Star Belgrade footballers
Oakland Clippers players
AS Nancy Lorraine players
San Jose Earthquakes (1974–1988) players
Yugoslav First League players
National Professional Soccer League (1967) players
Ligue 1 players
North American Soccer League (1968–1984) players
Yugoslav expatriate footballers
Expatriate footballers in France
Yugoslav expatriate sportspeople in France
Expatriate soccer players in the United States
Yugoslav expatriate sportspeople in the United States